Lužany is a municipality in the Topoľčany District of the Nitra Region, Slovakia. In 2011 it had 203 inhabitants.

References

External links
http://en.e-obce.sk/obec/luzany/luzany.html
https://web.archive.org/web/20131209054107/http://www.mesta-obce.sk/nitriansky-kraj/okres-topolcany/luzany/

Villages and municipalities in Topoľčany District